The definist fallacy can refer to several logical fallacies related to how terms are defined in an argument.

Definist fallacy, coined by William Frankena, involves the definition of one property in terms of another
Persuasive definition
Loki's Wager, in which terms are required to be defined before use
Continuum fallacy